Atwima Rural Bank Ltd is a rural bank founded in 1980 and located in Kumasi, Ghana.

Like other rural banks in Ghana it provides banking services to the rural population and is regulated by the ARB Apex Bank.

In 2008 the bank informed that its deposits grew from GH¢29,379 in 2006 to GH¢3,615,010 in 2007.

Atwima Rural Bank was included to The impact of Rural Banks on Poverty Alleviation in Ghana study, because it operates at peri-urban area.

References

External links 
Homepage

Banks of Ghana
Banks established in 1980
1980 establishments in Ghana
Kumasi